The 1936 United States Senate election in New Hampshire took place on November 3, 1936. Incumbent Republican Senator Henry W. Keyes did not run for re-election. 

Governor of New Hampshire Styles Bridges won the open election to succeed him, defeating former Senator George H. Moses in the Republican primary and Democratic U.S. Representative William N. Rogers in the general election. Bridges would win four more elections to the seat; this election was the closest of his career.

Primary elections were held on September 15, 1936.

Republican primary

Candidates
Styles Bridges, incumbent Governor of New Hampshire
William J. Callahan
George H. Moses, former U.S. Senator (1918–1933)

Results

Democratic primary

Candidates
William N. Rogers, U.S. Representative from Wakefield

Results

General election

Candidates
Styles Bridges, incumbent Governor of New Hampshire (Republican)
Stearns Morse, Dartmouth College professor of English (Farmer-Labor)
William N. Rogers, U.S. Representative from Wakefield (Democratic)

Results

See also 
 1936 United States Senate elections

References

Bibliography
 

1936
New Hampshire
United States Senate